Bjarki Steinn Bjarkason (born 11 May 2000) is an Icelandic professional footballer who plays as a winger for Italian  club Foggia, on loan from Venezia. He represents the Iceland national team.

Club career
Bjarki made his debut for Afturelding in a 3–1 win against Völsungur on 15 July 2017. On 6 December 2017, he joined ÍA and played there for 3 years. On 21 August 2020, he joined Venezia.

On 14 January 2022, he joined Serie C club Catanzaro on loan until the end of the season.

Upon his return from loan, Bjarki did not make any league appearances for Venezia in the first half of the 2022–23 season, playing in one Coppa Italia game. On 20 January 2023, he was loaned to Serie C club Foggia.

Personal life
His father is former international handballer Bjarki Sigurðsson.

References

External links
 
 

2000 births
Living people
Sportspeople from Reykjavík
Bjarki Steinn Bjarkason
Association football midfielders
Úrvalsdeild karla (football) players
Afturelding men's football players
Íþróttabandalag Akraness players
Serie A players
Serie B players
Serie C players
Venezia F.C. players
U.S. Catanzaro 1929 players
Calcio Foggia 1920 players
Bjarki Steinn Bjarkason
Expatriate footballers in Italy
Icelandic expatriate sportspeople in Italy
Iceland youth international footballers
Iceland under-21 international footballers